Dog sports are sports in which dogs participate.

Herding sports

 Herding
 Sheepdog trial
 Treibball

Obedience sports

 Heelwork to music
 Musical canine freestyle
 Obedience trial
 Rally obedience

Protection sports

 IGP (Previously known as IPO or Schutzhund)
 See also: List of protection sports

Pulling sports

 Bikejoring
 Canicross
 Carting
 Dog scootering
 Mushing
 Skijoring
 Weight pulling

Racing sports

 Dachshund racing
 Greyhound and Whippet racing
 Jack Russell Terrier racing
 Sighthound racing
 Sled dog racing
 Terrier racing

Tracking and hunting sports

 Barn hunt
 Coon hunting field trial
 Earthdog trial
 Field trial
 Hare coursing
 Hound trailing
 Lure coursing
 Nosework
 Tracking trial
 Trail hunting
 Shed Antler Hunting

Water sports

 Dock jumping, also known as dock diving
 Dog surfing, sometimes also used to describe dogs standup paddleboarding.

 Water Rescue

Other sports

 Agility
 Disc dog
 Flyball
 Dog Puller

References

Further reading
 Sundance, K. (2010). 101 Ways to Do More With Your Dog: Make Your Dog a Superdog with Sports, Games, Exercises, Tricks, Mental Challenges, Crafts, and Bonding. Beverly, MA: Quarry Books.